Terry Adams (born in Australia) was a rugby league footballer for North Sydney. He played first-grade rugby league for Norths between 1973 and 1979. He played three consecutive seasons with over 20 games between 1975 and 1977 but before and after those years played very little first grade rugby league.

References

Australian rugby league players
North Sydney Bears players
Year of birth missing (living people)
Living people
Rugby league wingers
Rugby league centres
Place of birth missing (living people)